Loved Ones, Loved One, The Loved Ones, or The Loved One may refer to:

Films
The Loved One (film), a 1965 American satire based on Evelyn Waugh novel 
The Loved Ones (film), a 2009 Australian horror film by Sean Byrne

Literature
The Loved One, a 1948 short satirical novel by Evelyn Waugh 
Loved Ones (book), a 1985 selection of pen portraits by Diana Mitford

Music
The Loved Ones (Australian band), a 1960s Melbourne rock band
"The Loved One" (song), a 1966 song by the Australian band
The Loved Ones (American band), a Philadelphia rock band
The Loved Ones (EP), a 2005 EP by the American band
Loved Ones (album), a 1996 album by Ellis Marsalis and Branford Marsalis
"The Loved Ones", a 1982 song by Elvis Costello and the Attractions from Imperial Bedroom
"Loved Ones", a 2003 song by Starflyer 59 from Old
 Loved One (album), a 2014 album by Kento Masuda